Rebekah (2001) is the second novel in the Women of Genesis series by Orson Scott Card.

Plot introduction
Rebekah follows the story of Isaac through the eyes and perspective of Rebekah.  The story-line does not deviate from the story told in Genesis, but Card does add details and characters of his own invention.

Author's comments on the book 
In his introduction to the book, Scott Card says that much of what he includes in the novel is speculation and adds that, "The task in this novel was to show how good people can sometimes do bad things to those they love most." He goes on to say, "Isaac was headed for a disastrously wrong decision; Rebekah chose an equally wrong method of stopping him...but in the end, the result was a good one because good people made the best of it despite all the mistakes."

See also

List of works by Orson Scott Card
Orson Scott Card

References

External links
 About the novel Rebekah from Card's website

2001 American novels
Cultural depictions of Isaac
Forge Books books
Novels based on the Bible
Novels by Orson Scott Card
Novels set in ancient Israel
Sequel novels